New Profit is a nonprofit social innovation organization and venture philanthropy fund based in Boston, Massachusetts.

History
New Profit was founded in 1998 by social entrepreneur Vanessa Kirsch. After starting and growing two nonprofits—Public Allies and the Women's Information Network—Kirsch took a year to travel the world, interviewing social entrepreneurs and citizens across 22 countries. Through this experience, she came to understand that the nonprofit sector lacks sufficient access to second-stage growth capital, locking social entrepreneurs and their funders into a start-up phase mentality. She determined that in order for social entrepreneurs to have the greatest possible impact, they needed access to financial resources that could allow them to sustain and grow their program models.

In 1996, she began laying the groundwork for a venture philanthropy fund that would provide social entrepreneurs and their organizations with funding and valuable strategic consulting services. After over a year of research and development with a team of social entrepreneurs, academics, and philanthropists, Kirsch and a partner founded New Profit in 1998. With support from Monitor Group and under Kirsch's continued leadership, New Profit has worked with 34 nonprofit organizations to date.

New Profit was based in Cambridge, MA from its founding in 1998 until a move to Boston in April 2013.

Mission and model
New Profit's mission is to help innovative social entrepreneurs and their organizations dramatically improve opportunities for children, families, and communities. New Profit works to fulfill this mission through two related approaches:

1. Directly supporting a group of social entrepreneur-led nonprofits with multi-year grants and strategic support.

2. Developing field-wide initiatives through the Action Tank that seek to help all social entrepreneurs and their organizations impact the social problems they seek to solve.

Direct support to organizations
New Profit provides grants to organizations that address issues in education, workforce development, public health, or poverty alleviation through its portfolio. Once a nonprofit organization has received funding, New Profit focuses on support efforts that help integrate financial and strategic resources to help the organization develop and grow into a sustainable program.

A staff member at New Profit works with each organization that New Profit funds as a portfolio manager. This person takes a board seat and acts as a day-to-day advisor to the organization, building a partnership with the social entrepreneur and creating a plan for future projects that are tailored to the organization's needs. The strategic support each nonprofit receives assumes a variety of forms, from refining the organizations’ social change model and helping find talent, to developing and coaching the board. In addition, New Profit also offers strategic growth planning and executive coaching for the social entrepreneur, and connects each nonprofit with pro-bono consulting services from Monitor Group.

With funding awarded in July 2010 through the federal Social Innovation Fund, New Profit developed the Pathways Fund, through which it makes grants to organizations that focus on helping disconnected youth ages 18 to 24. The Pathways Fund will seek to improve high school completion rates, increase college enrollment and persistence, and better prepare youth to enter the workforce in select geographies across the U.S.

Action Tank initiatives
In 2004, as it began to see program results from its first group of supported nonprofits, New Profit created the Action Tank in an effort to work beyond the organizations it directly funds. The Action Tank has initiatives in three focus areas:

  Federal Policy:  Through an initiative called America Forward, a nonpartisan coalition of nearly 50 nonprofit organizations, New Profit seeks to advance a policy agenda and create an infrastructure for social entrepreneurs and government to act together to grow of effective nonprofit organizations.
  Events:  Through its annual event, the Gathering of Leaders, New Profit brings together leaders from the public, private, philanthropic, and nonprofit sectors to develop new ideas, relationships, and resources and help build stronger nonprofit organizations.

Impact
New Profit tracks the progress of organizations it funds against five major focus areas—impact and innovation, growth, leadership and governance, organizational strategy, and metrics. To measure this progress, New Profit has developed a Growth Diagnostic Tool that it uses to assess the development of each nonprofit it funds and to then focus additional support where it is most necessary.
 
Within the portfolio of nonprofit organizations it supports, New Profit targets a 30 percent compound annual growth rate for revenue and a 40 percent compound annual growth rate for clients served. In 2009, New Profit reported that its portfolio of supported organizations achieved a 35 percent compound annual growth rate for revenue and a 40 percent compound annual growth rate for clients served.

Current investments
 Achievement First
 BUILD 
 College Possible
 College Summit
 Eye to Eye
 Family Independence Initiative
 First Place for Youth
 Health Leads
 iMentor
 Knowledge Is Power Program (KIPP)
 LIFT
 Management Leadership for Tomorrow (MLT)
 National College Advising Corps
 New Leaders
 New Teacher Center
 Peace First
 Peer Health Exchange
 Single Stop USA
 Teach For All
 The Mission Continues
 Turnaround for Children
 Year Up
 YouthBuild USA

Past investments
 Building Educated Leaders for Life (BELL)
 Citizen Schools
 Computers for Youth
 Freelancers Union
 Girls for a Change
 Jumpstart for Young Children
 Kids Voting USA
 Rare Conservation
 Right To Play
 Stand for Children
 Teach For America
 Upwardly Global

References

Non-profit organizations based in Boston
Organizations established in 1998
1998 establishments in Massachusetts